This is a list of National Football League players who have led the regular season in scoring each year. 

The NFL did not begin keeping official records until the 1932 season.

NFL annual scoring leaders

Through  season per Pro-Football-Reference and FootballDB.

AFL annual scoring leaders
Players who lead the league in scoring from the American Football League.

AAFC annual scoring leaders
Players who lead the league in scoring from the All-America Football Conference.

See also 
 List of National Football League career scoring leaders
 List of National Football League records (individual)

References 

National Football League records and achievements
National Football League lists